Winterspelt is a 1978 West German war film directed by  and starring , Hans Christian Blech, George Sewell, Garrick Hagon, David Healy, George Roubicek, Frederick Jaeger, Katharina Thalbach and . It is set during the Second World War. It was also released as Winterspelt 1944.

Plot
The film is set in September 1944, when a German Wehrmacht officer tries to surrender his unit, stationed in the West German village of Winterspelt, to nearby American forces.

References

External links 
 

West German films
1978 films
1970s war films
German war films
1970s German-language films
German World War II films
Western Front of World War II films
1970s German films